Jebel Dhana Airport  is a small private airfield operated by ADNOC and serves the oil field at Jebel Dhana, Abu Dhabi, UAE.

References

Airports in the United Arab Emirates